The Wallet is a 1952 British crime film directed by Morton Lewis to a script by Ted Willis. It was produced as a second feature for release on a double bill. The film was released in the US as Blueprint for Danger the following year.

Plot
The script follows a lost wallet found by a passing stranger with a pipe (played by Longden), and the following events.

Cast
John Longden as Man With Pipe
Chili Bouchier as Babs
Roberta Huby as Dot Johnson
Alfred Farrell as Harry Maythorpe 
Hilda Fenemore as Alice Maythorpe
Diana Calderwood as  May Jenkins

References

External links
 

1952 films
1952 crime films
British crime films
British black-and-white films
Films with screenplays by Ted Willis, Baron Willis
1950s English-language films
1950s British films